Isabel Island is an inhabited island in the province of Romblon in the Philippines. It is part of barangay Nasunogan in the municipality of Banton. In the 1918 census, the island together with its sister island Carlota Island constituted one single barrio named Isla de las Dos Hermanas (Spanish: Two Sisters Island) with 23 inhabitants.

See also
 List of islands of the Philippines

External links
 Isabel Island at OpenStreetMap

Islands of Romblon
Inactive volcanoes of the Philippines